Kirk Powell (born 17 June 1972 in Jamaica) was a Jamaican cricket player. He was a right-handed batsman and right-arm fast-medium bowler. He played four first-class and 11 List A matches for Jamaica between 1999 and 1998. He later played for the Middlesex Cricket Board in 2001 and 2002 in their matches in the C&G Trophy.

References
Cricket Archive profile

1972 births
Living people
Jamaican expatriates in the United Kingdom
Jamaican cricketers
Commonwealth Games competitors for Jamaica
Cricketers at the 1998 Commonwealth Games
Middlesex Cricket Board cricketers
Jamaica cricketers